Joseph Antoine Toussaint Dinouart (November 1, 1716 – April 23, 1786) was a preacher, polemicist, compiler of sacred learning, and apologist for French feminism.

Born in Amiens, he was ordained as a priest in there in 1740. In his youth, he showed a talent for Latin poetry, but soon neglected this in favor of his religious studies. After writing a short essay on women's rights, he had a falling out with his bishop and moved to Paris, where he joined the Saint-Eustache parish. He soon left, however, to tutor the son of a police lieutenant. This position gave him a stable yearly income and allowed Dinouart to devote himself to the study of literature.

In 1760, he founded the Journal ecclésiastique, which he edited until his death. The collected work of this journal numbers more than 100 volumes. It contains extracts from sermons, treatises on morality and piety, and research on ecclesiastical law and councils.

Written works
1. Lettre à l'abbé Gouget, au sujet des hymnes de Santeuil, adoptées dans le nouveau Bréviaire
2. Le Triomphe du sexe
3. Éloquence du corps dans le ministère de la chaire
4. Manuel des pasteurs
5. Exercitium diurnum, seu Manuale precum in usum et gratiam sacerdotum ; nunc denuo editum a sacerdote gallicano exsule

Translations
Father Dinouart made numerous translations from Latin, including a translation of Cicero.

Works edited
Dinouart served as the editor or compiler of many books and journals. Among these was L'art de se taire, principalement en matière de religion, a nearly perfection transcription of an earlier anonymous work entitled Conduite pour se taire et pour parler, principalement en matière de religion. This was re-issued in Paris in 1987.

References
"Joseph Antoine Toussaint Dinouart." Biographie universelle ancienne et moderne : histoire par ordre alphabétique de la vie publique et privée de tous les hommes avec la collaboration de plus de 300 savants et littérateurs français ou étrangers, Ed. Louis-Gabriel Michaud. 1843–1865.

see also :fr:Joseph Antoine Toussaint Dinouart

1716 births
1786 deaths
Apologetics
French feminists
18th-century French Roman Catholic priests
Male feminists
Proponents of Christian feminism
French male writers